The Jabiru 2200 is a lightweight naturally aspirated, pushrod four-stroke, flat four, air-cooled aircraft engine produced by Jabiru Aircraft.

Design and development
The conventional direct-drive engine is fitted with an alternator, silencers, vacuum pump drives and dual ignition systems as standard.  The engine generates up to 80 bhp at 3,300 rpm.

In Europe the engine competes with the Rotax 912, another flat four four-stroke engine, but one that has water-cooled cylinder heads and a geared reduction drive to the propeller.

Jabiru Aircraft began as a builder of small two-seater aircraft in Bundaberg, Australia. It turned to producing its own engines when supplies of the Italian-sourced engines previously used dried up. Jabiru engines are designed to be manufactured in small batch quantities, so the firm uses CNC machines to mill major engine parts such as cylinder blocks and heads, rather than using cast items.

A larger variant of this engine is the flat-six Jabiru 3300 which, being of modular design, shares many parts with the J2200.

In December 2010 the CEA-308, powered by the Jabiru 2200, set four FAI records for aircraft weighing less than 300 kg. It averaged 223 miles/hour for four runs over the 3-km low-altitude course and 203 mph on a 100-km circuit.

CASA restrictions
In November 2014 the Australian Civil Aviation Safety Authority (CASA) proposed restricting all Jabiru-powered aircraft to day-visual flight rules (VFR) only, without passengers or solo students and within gliding distance of a safe place to land due to the engine line's safety record. The final rule adopted somewhat softened the restrictions, allowing the carriage of passengers and students, but requiring them to sign an acknowledgement of risk before flying and restricting equipped aircraft to day VFR flight and within gliding distance of a safe place to land. Both the manufacturer and Recreational Aviation Australia (RA-Aus) opposed the restrictions as unnecessary and unwarranted. RA-Aus reported that it was supplied with only a fraction of CASA's source data – just a day before submissions closed – and that CASA seemed to have excluded all engine reliability data post-"early 2014".

As of July 1, 2016, these restrictions were lifted for "most Jabiru-powered aircraft in Australia. Stock Jabiru engines that are maintained in strict accordance with Jabiru service bulletins and maintenance instructions are no longer affected by the limitations, which were issued in late 2014."

Applications

Specifications

See also

References

External links

 Official website

Boxer engines
1990s aircraft piston engines
Jabiru aircraft engines